Nguyễn Chí Dũng (born 5 August 1960) is a Vietnamese politician currently serving as Minister of Planning and Investment in the Government of Vietnam.

References 

Living people
1960 births
Members of the 11th Central Committee of the Communist Party of Vietnam
Members of the 12th Central Committee of the Communist Party of Vietnam
Members of the 13th Central Committee of the Communist Party of Vietnam
Government ministers of Vietnam
21st-century Vietnamese politicians
Members of the National Assembly (Vietnam)